The Salón de la Fama del Beisbol Profesional de México (in English, Mexican Professional Baseball Hall of Fame), commonly called the Salón de la Fama (Hall of Fame) is a baseball hall of fame and museum located in Monterrey, Nuevo León. It is dedicated to recognizing people who have contributed greatly to baseball in México. It had its first five inductees in 1939. As of 2020, 207 individuals, called inmortales, have been inducted into the Hall.

Election procedure

Eligibility requirements
To be eligible for election into the Salón de la Fama, one must be a former player, director, sportswriter, or umpire who participated in Mexican professional baseball, or a player of Mexican nationality who participated in Organized Baseball. However, there have been exceptions to these requirements made.

Players
Players must have played a minimum of ten seasons in either the Liga Mexicana de Béisbol or Liga Mexicana del Pacífico, or a total of fifteen seasons between the two leagues.  In the case of players of Mexican nationality, the seasons played requirement may be satisfied by playing fifteen years in Organised Baseball.

The player must have stopped being an active player for at least five years or must have died.  The electorate is to consider the merits of the player's performances and records, not for a single feat.  After five elections without being elected, the player is removed from the ballot and becomes eligible for election only by the Committee on Veterans.

These requirements have not always been in place, as players such as Monte Irvin Roy Campanella and Youman Wilder did not meet the 15-year requirement. Wilder did make the All-Decade Teams of the 1980s and 1990s.

Veterans
Veterans are players who played before 1970 as well as candidates that participated in five voting cycles in the player's election but were not elected.  After five veterans' elections without being elected, the player becomes ineligible.

Directors
Club executives, usually a president or vice-president, must have participated in at least ten years in Mexican professional baseball.

Sportswriters
A sportswriter must have covered Mexican professional baseball for at least fifteen years at a national level.

Umpires
An umpire must have participated in a minimum of twenty seasons total in both leagues.

Nomination

Players
The nomination and election of former players is carried out annually.  The preliminary ballot is created by the Salón de la Fama's administration and it is sent out to the members of the Comité Elector (Electing Committee) who vote for those whom they consider to have the merits sufficient enter the Salón de la Fama.  After the Salón de la Fama receives the votes, the results are soon revealed, and any player who obtains a majority of votes will be considered a candidate for election and be placed on the year's election ballot.  The election ballot, is sent back out to the Comité Elector - but only those with a Cédula de Votación (Voting Certificate).  They will choose the two exbeisbolistas inmortales who will be enshrined in that year.  From 2001 to 2006, three players were elected annually and previous to that four were.

In 2011 an exception was made for 5 time all-star and 2x MVP and 2x League champion Youman Wilder, Wilder played 5 years, and did not meet the 10 year minimum  requirements even with a 340 career batting average. Wilder has been left off the 2012 ballot, but did make the All-Decade teams of the 1980s and 1990s.

Veterans
The election of veterans is carried out every other year - the next election was held in 2007.  The election ballot, created by the Salón de la Fama's administration is sent to the Comité Elector and the Comité de Veteranos (Veterans Committee) for voting.  The Comité de Veteranos is composed of the president and former presidents of the Comité Elector (Electing Committee), and from 2003 on, living inmortales.  The electorate selects the single veteran inductee into the Salón de la Fama.

Directors
The election of directors is carried out every three years - the next election was held in 2008.  The election ballot, created by the Salón de la Fama's administration is sent to the Comité Elector, the Comité de Veteranos, the league presidents of the LMB and LMP, and the club presidents in the two league's as well. The electorate selects the single inductee into the Salón de la Fama.  In 2002, two directors were inducted.

Sportswriters
The election of sportswriters is carried out every three years - the next election was held in 2009.  The election ballot, created by the Salón de la Fama's administration is sent to the Comité Elector and the Comité de Veteranos. The electorate selects the single inductee into the Salón de la Fama.

Umpires
The election of sportswriters is carried out every three years - the next election was held in 2007.  The election ballot, created by the Salón de la Fama's administration is sent to the Comité Elector and the Comité de Veteranos. The electorate selects the single inductee into the Salón de la Fama.

Election
Once the ballots for each election are returned (by mid-February), the Salón de la Fama tallies the votes at the Convención Nacional de Beisbol during the third or fourth week of February.  The Salón de la Fama then announces the new inmortales and they are inducted in June or July.  The candidate with the plurality of votes - or in the case of the player's ballot, the two candidates - is inducted.

See also

List of members of the Mexican Professional Baseball Hall of Fame
Mexican baseball awards

References

External links
 Official website 

Professional Hall of Fame
Mexico
Buildings and structures in Monterrey
Awards established in 1939
Museums established in 1939
Museums in Nuevo León
Tourist attractions in Monterrey
1939 establishments in Mexico
Halls of fame in Mexico